Thomas Baker (died 1625), of Whittingham Hall in Fressingfield, Suffolk and Leyton, Essex, was an English politician.

He was a Member of Parliament (MP) for Arundel in 1601.

He married Constance Kingsmill, a daughter of William Kingsmill.

References

16th-century births
1625 deaths
16th-century English people
People from Leyton
People from Mid Suffolk District
English MPs 1601